The North Dakota High School Activities Association (NDHSAA) is the governing body for the U.S. state of North Dakota's high-school athletics and fine arts. The current executive director of the NDHSAA is Matthew Fetsch and the headquarters are located in Valley City, North Dakota.

History
In the fall of 1907 Superintendent G.W. Hanna of Valley City and invited representatives of a few other schools to a meeting in Valley City, North Dakota to discuss standardizing high school athletics in the state. A second meeting, called by Principal H.L. Rockwood of Valley City for the adoption of a constitution was held in Grand Forks on January 1 and 2, 1908 and would lead to the creation of the North Dakota High School League. 29 schools attended this meeting, but only four schools (Valley City, Jamestown, Grafton and Grand Forks) became charter members. Casselton and Hankinson joined later that school year. There was a steady growth in membership with 80 schools belonging by 1921 and 103 out of 162 classified high schools by 1925. Superintendent G.W. Hanna served as president for a first year and a half, and was succeeded by Superintendent A.G. Crane of Jamestown after the 1908-09 school year.

Basketball
From 1914 to 1932 all North Dakota High School Activities Association member high schools played basketball under a single classification. three small school during this period won state titles: Tower City in 1915, Michigan in 1917, and Petersburg in 1919. In 1922, a number of schools from small towns organized the Consolidated League for the purpose of competing for a state championship with schools of similar enrollments. This league continued to operate through 1950. In 1933, the schools still competing under the sponsorship of the NDHSAA were divided up into Class A and Class B and, in 1948, the Class C division was created by the NDHSAA. The Consolidated League joined the Class C in 1950 and that combined organization remained in operation through 1963. Currently all high school basketball teams compete in either Class B or Class A.

Sports offered

	
Boys' Sports
 baseball
 basketball
 cross country
 football
 9 man football
 golf
 hockey
 soccer
 swimming & diving
 tennis
 track & field
 wrestling

	
Girls' Sports
 basketball
 cheerleading
 cross country
 a golf
 b golf
 gymnastics
 hockey
 soccer
 softball
 swimming & diving
 tennis
 track & field
 volleyball
 wrestling

Activities
 Journalism
 Music
 All-State Band
 All-State Chorus
 All-State Jazz Band
 All-State Orchestra
 Region Music
 Speech
 Debate & Individual Events
 One-Act Play & Technical Theatre
 Oral Interpretation 
 Student Council
 Student Congress
 Visual Arts

Notable alumni
Roger Maris
Carson Wentz
Connor McGovern
Chris Coste
Griffin Neal
Laura Roesler
Brooks Bollinger
Clifton Emmet "Cliff" Cushman
Tyler Kleven

References

External links
North Dakota High School Activities Association website

 
High school sports associations in the United States